Anfernee Frederick (born 23 January 1996) is a Dominican professional footballer who plays as a midfielder for Bath Estate and the Dominica national team.

Club career
Frederick got his career underway with Bath Estate of the Dominica Premiere League, where he remained for three years. In 2015, TT Pro League side W Connection completed the signing of Frederick. He made his continental competition debut for the Trinidad and Tobago club on 4 August 2015, featuring for the final eleven minutes of a CONCACAF Champions League group stage defeat away to Liga MX's Santos Laguna. Frederick returned to Bath Estate in 2016.

International career
Frederick appeared for the Dominica U17s in qualifying for the 2011 CONCACAF U-17 Championship in Jamaica, being selected for matches with Guyana and the Netherlands Antilles as Dominica placed last. He won his first cap for the senior squad in an April 2014 friendly with Saint Lucia. Frederick's first competitive appearances for Dominica came in June 2015, when he played in 2018 FIFA World Cup qualification encounters with Canada. He scored his first international goal on 4 March 2019 at the 2019 Windward Islands Tournament against Grenada. He netted again in the succeeding September, scoring versus Suriname in the 2019–20 CONCACAF Nations League B.

Career statistics

International
.

International goals
Scores and results list Dominica's goal tally first.

References

External links

1996 births
Living people
People from Roseau
Dominica footballers
Dominica international footballers
Association football midfielders
Dominica expatriate footballers
Expatriate footballers in Trinidad and Tobago
Dominica expatriate sportspeople in Trinidad and Tobago
Bath Estate FC players
W Connection F.C. players